Joseph Edward Bromberg (born Josef Bromberger, December 25, 1903 – December 6, 1951) was a Hungarian-born American character actor in motion picture and stage productions dating mostly from the 1930s and 1940s. Knowledge of his past as a member of the Communist Party led to a defiant appearance before the House Un-American Activities Committee, shortly before his death.

Bromberg is considered a victim of red-baiting and a casualty of the Hollywood Blacklist. He is best known, historically, as being one of the "names" named by director Elia Kazan in the director's second appearance before HUAC.

Early years
Born to a Jewish family in Temesvár, Austria-Hungary (now Timișoara, Romania), Bromberg was 11 months old when his parents, Herman and Josephine Roth Bromberg, emigrated to the United States with him in the second cabin class on the S/S Graf Waldersee, which sailed from Cuxhaven, Germany, 18 March 1905 and arrived at the Port of New York, 31 March. They settled in New York City. After graduating from Stuyvesant High School, he attended City College of New York for two years and then went to work to help pay for acting lessons with the Russian coach Leo Bulgakov, who had trained with Konstantin Stanislavski.

Career 

By virtue of his physique, the short, somewhat rotund actor was destined to play secondary roles. Bromberg made his stage debut at the Greenwich Village Playhouse and in 1926 made his first appearance in a Broadway play, Princess Turandot. The following year, Bromberg married Goldie Doberman, with whom he had three children.

Occasionally credited as J.E. Bromberg' and Joseph Bromberg, he performed secondary roles in 35 Broadway productions and 53 motion pictures until 1951. For two decades, Bromberg was highly regarded in the New York theatrical world and was a founding member of the Civic Repertory Theatre (1928–1930) and of the Group Theatre (1931–1940).

Bromberg made his screen debut in 1936 under contract to Twentieth Century-Fox. The versatile actor played a wide variety of roles ranging from a ruthless New York newspaper editor (in Charlie Chan on Broadway) to a despotic Arabian sheik (in Mr. Moto Takes a Chance) to the Alcade of Los Angeles (opposite Tyrone Power in The Mark of Zorro). Although he spoke with no trace of an accent, he was often called upon to play humble immigrants of various nationalities. When Warner Oland, the actor who played Charlie Chan, died in 1938, Fox considered Bromberg as a replacement, but the role ultimately went to Sidney Toler. Fox began loaning Bromberg to other studios in 1939 and finally dropped him from the roster in 1941. He kept working for various producers, including a stint at Universal Pictures in the mid-1940s; his employment there came to an abrupt halt when a change in management did away with all low-budget productions.

Bromberg's most outstanding attribute was his facility with sensitive character roles; he could take a standard, undistinguished supporting part and make it unforgettably sympathetic. In Hollywood Cavalcade he portrays Don Ameche's friend who knows he will never get the girl; in Three Sons he is the lowly business associate who longs to be given a partnership; in Easy to Look At he is the once-great couturier now reduced to night watchman. Only occasionally was Bromberg given leading roles: he played a homespun detective in Fair Warning (1937), Fox's attempt to create an "American" counterpart to its Charlie Chan and Mr. Moto series; and in PRC's The Missing Corpse (1945) he played a victim of circumstance who finds a corpse in the trunk of his car.

In September 1950, the anti-communist magazine Red Channels accused Bromberg of being a member of the American Communist Party. Subpoenaed to testify before the House Committee on Un-American Activities in June 1951, Bromberg refused to answer any questions in accordance with his Fifth Amendment rights. Bromberg refused to tell the Committee whether or not he was a member of the Communist Party. He also declined to pledge his support in defense of the United States if ever there were a war with the Soviet Union. Bromberg attacked the Committee for holding hearings "in the nature of witch hunts."  As the result of his defiant testimony before the committee, Bromberg was blacklisted from working in Hollywood. He suffered enormous stress from the ordeal; friends, such as Lee Grant, noted that he aged considerably in a very short time.

Death
In 1951 Bromberg sought work in England, but died within the year, of a heart attack while working in the London play The Biggest Thief in Town. He was just a few weeks short of his 48th birthday.

In 1952, he and seven other Group Theater members were named by Elia Kazan as Communist Party members in testimony before the House Un-American Activities Committee. According to Kazan in his 1988 autobiography A Life, the Group Theatre Communist Party cell he belonged to in the Group Theatre met in Bromberg's dressing room. Members of the cell included Clifford Odets and Paula Strasberg.

Broadway roles

 Princess Turandot (1926) - Tartaglia and as Ishmael
 House of Connelly (1931) - Duffy
 Night Over Taos (1932) - Pablo Montoya
 Both Your Houses (1933) - Wingblatt
 Men in White (1933) - Dr. Hochberg
 Gold Eagle Guy (1934) - Guy Button
 Awake and Sing! (1935) - Uncle Morty
 Jacobowsky and the Colonel (1945) - Szabuniewicz 
 The Big Knife (1949) - Marcus Hoff

Filmography

 Under Two Flags (1936) - Col, Ferol (film debut)
 Sins of Man (1936) - Anton Engel
 The Crime of Dr. Forbes (1936) - Dr. Eric Godfrey
 Girls' Dormitory (1936) - Dr. Spindler
 Star for a Night (1936) - Doctor Spelimeyer
 Ladies in Love (1936) - Franz Brenner
 Reunion (1936) - Charles Renard
 Stowaway (1936) - Judge Booth
 Fair Warning (1937) - Matthew Jericho
 Seventh Heaven (1937) - Aristide the Astrologer
 That I May Live (1937) - Tex Shapiro
 Charlie Chan on Broadway (1937) - Murdock
 Second Honeymoon (1937) - Herbie
 The Baroness and the Butler (1938) - Zorda
 Sally, Irene and Mary (1938) - Pawnbroker
 Rebecca of Sunnybrook Farm (1938) - Dr. Hill
 Four Men and a Prayer (1938) - General Torres
 One Wild Night (1938) - Norman
 Mr. Moto Takes a Chance (1938) - Rajah Ali
 I'll Give a Million (1938) - Editor
 Suez (1938) - Prince Said
 Jesse James (1939) - Mr. Runyan
 Wife, Husband and Friend (1939) - Rossi
 Three Sons (1939) - Abe Ullman
 Hollywood Cavalcade (1939) - Dave Spingold
 Strange Cargo (1940) - Flaubert
 The Return of Frank James (1940) - George Runyan
 The Mark of Zorro (1940) - Don Luis Quintero
 Dance Hall (1941) - Max Brandon
 Hurricane Smith (1941) - 'Eggs' Bonelli
 The Devil Pays Off (1941) - Arnold DeBrock
 Pacific Blackout (1941) - Pickpocket
 Invisible Agent (1942) - Karl Heiser
 Halfway to Shanghai (1942) - Major Vinpore
 Life Begins at Eight-Thirty (1942) - Sid Gordon
 Reunion in France (1942) - Durand
 Tennessee Johnson (1942) - Coke
 Lady of Burlesque (1943) - S.B. Foss
 Phantom of the Opera (1943) - Amiot
 Son of Dracula (1943) - Professor Lazlo
 Chip Off the Old Block (1944) - Blaney Wright
 Voice in the Wind (1944) - Dr. Hoffman
 Salome, Where She Danced (1945) - Prof. Max
 The Missing Corpse (1945) - Henry Kruger
 Easy to Look At (1945) - Gustav
 Pillow of Death (1945) - Julian Julian
 Tangier (1945) - Alec Rocco
 The Walls Came Tumbling Down (1946) - Ernst Helms
 Cloak and Dagger (1946) - Trenk
 Queen of the Amazons (1947) - Gabby
 Arch of Triumph (1948) - Hotel Manager at the Verdun
 A Song Is Born (1948) - Dr. Elfini
 I Shot Jesse James (1949) - Kane
 Guilty Bystander (1950) - Varkas (final film)

References

External links 

 
 
  Find a Grave
 J. Edward Bromberg papers, 1924-1951, held by the Billy Rose Theatre Division, New York Public Library for the Performing Arts
 Museum of the City of New York 1933 photo of J. Edward Bromberg (standing) with Grouip Theatre members

1903 births
1951 deaths
Hungarian Jews
Austro-Hungarian emigrants to the United States
American people of Hungarian-Jewish descent
Jewish American male actors
American male stage actors
American male film actors
Hollywood blacklist
People from the Kingdom of Hungary
Male actors from New York City
20th-century American male actors
Stuyvesant High School alumni
20th-century American Jews